Raúl Martín del Campo (born 27 July 1982), known simply as Raúl, is a Spanish retired footballer who played as a forward.

Football career
Born in Santander, Cantabria, Raúl started his professional career with hometown's Racing de Santander. He made his first-team – and La Liga – debut on 11 January 2004, playing 26 minutes in a 1–1 away draw against Deportivo de La Coruña after coming on as a substitute for Omri Afek.

Raúl split the 2004–05 season on loan, to SD Eibar (second division, no appearances) and Gimnástica de Torrelavega (third, relegation). He subsequently returned to Racing for the 2005–06 campaign, going on to receive relative playing time as the side narrowly avoided top flight relegation – six starts and 529 minutes of play, including 75 in a 2–1 win over Real Madrid at the Santiago Bernabéu Stadium.

However, Raúl mostly represented Racing's reserves during his tenure with the club, also being loaned to Mérida UD and dropping down from the third level from 2008 to 2010. He had his first abroad experience in the summer of 2010, joining Liga I team CS Gaz Metan Mediaș and being released from contract in late October 2011, having been rarely used due to a serious injury.

References

External links

1982 births
Living people
Spanish footballers
Footballers from Santander, Spain
Association football forwards
La Liga players
Segunda División B players
Tercera División players
Rayo Cantabria players
Racing de Santander players
SD Eibar footballers
Gimnástica de Torrelavega footballers
Mérida UD footballers
Liga I players
CS Gaz Metan Mediaș players
Spanish expatriate footballers
Expatriate footballers in Romania
Spanish expatriate sportspeople in Romania